The Texas Trail is a 1925 American silent Western film directed by Scott R. Dunlap and featuring Harry Carey.

Plot
As described in a film magazine reviews, when Betty Foster comes West, she finds that real cowboys are not a match to what movies have shown her. She has seen them through rose colored glasses. When a robbery occurs, a cowboy fails to protect her. She then disguises herself in a highwayman's clothing and recovers the loot. After she is captured by the bandits, her faith in the West is restored when cowboy Pete Grainger rescues her.

Cast
 Harry Carey as Pete Grainger
 Ethel Shannon as Betty Foster
 Charles K. French as Ring 'Em Foster
 Claude Payton as Dan Merrill
 Sidney Franklin as Ike Collander

See also
 Harry Carey filmography

References

External links

1925 films
American black-and-white films
1925 Western (genre) films
Films directed by Scott R. Dunlap
Producers Distributing Corporation films
Silent American Western (genre) films
1920s American films
1920s English-language films